Andrew Stueber (born July 1, 1999) is an American football guard for the New England Patriots of the National Football League (NFL). He played college football at Michigan. As a graduate student in 2021, he received second-team All-American recognition by AFCA.

College career
On June 25, 2016, Stueber announced his commitment to Michigan, as part of the highest-rated Michigan recruiting class in the modern era. He was ranked a four-star prospect by ESPN and the No. 4 player in the state of Connecticut.

As a junior in 2019, he suffered a torn ACL in training camp and missed the entire season. As a senior in 2020, he was recognized by the Walter Camp Football Foundation as the 2020 Connecticut Player of the Year.

As a graduate student in 2021, he helped lead the offensive line with the fewest sacks allowed (10) and third-fewest tackles for loss (27) nationally and is a semifinalist for the Joe Moore Award. Following the season he was named first-team All-Big Ten by the media and was named a second-team All-American by AFCA.

Professional career

Stueber was drafted in the seventh round, 245th overall, by the New England Patriots in the 2022 NFL Draft. He was placed on the reserve/non-football injury list on August 23, 2022.

References

External links
 New England Patriots bio
 Michigan Wolverines bio

1999 births
Living people
American football offensive linemen
Michigan Wolverines football players
New England Patriots players
People from Darien, Connecticut
Players of American football from Connecticut
Sportspeople from Fairfield County, Connecticut